Ng Hui Ern (born 1 June 1991) is a badminton player from Malaysia. She plays in the doubles event with her older sister Ng Hui Lin. She and her partner won three titles at the 2011–12 European Circuit tournament in Wales, Ireland and Austria. In 2014, Ng resigned from the Badminton Association of Malaysia.

Achievements

Asian Junior Championships 
Girls' doubles

BWF Grand Prix 
The BWF Grand Prix had two levels, the Grand Prix and Grand Prix Gold. It was a series of badminton tournaments sanctioned by the Badminton World Federation (BWF) and played between 2007 and 2017.

Women's doubles

  BWF Grand Prix Gold tournament
  BWF Grand Prix tournament

BWF International Challenge/Series 
Women's doubles

Mixed doubles

  BWF International Challenge tournament
  BWF International Series tournament

References

External links 

 

1991 births
Living people
Sportspeople from Kuala Lumpur
Malaysian sportspeople of Chinese descent
Malaysian female badminton players
21st-century Malaysian women